Henry Vaca Urquiza (born 27 January 1998) is a Bolivian professional footballer who plays as an attacking midfielder for Oriente Petrolero.

Career
Vaca made his professional debut with The Strongest in 2016. In 2019, he was loaned to Universitario. In 2020, he joined Atlético Goianiense also on loan.

International career
On 10 September 2018, Vaca made his debut for the Bolivia national football team starting in a friendly against Saudi Arabia.

Honours
The Strongest
Bolivian Primera División: 2016–17 Apertura

References

External links

1998 births
Living people
Bolivian footballers
Association football midfielders
Bolivian Primera División players
The Strongest players
O'Higgins F.C. footballers
Peruvian Primera División players
Club Universitario de Deportes footballers
Atlético Clube Goianiense players
Campeonato Brasileiro Série A players
Bolivia international footballers
Bolivian expatriate footballers
2021 Copa América players
Bolivian expatriate sportspeople in Chile
Bolivian expatriate sportspeople in Peru
Bolivian expatriate sportspeople in Brazil
Expatriate footballers in Chile
Expatriate footballers in Peru
Expatriate footballers in Brazil
Sportspeople from Santa Cruz de la Sierra
Bolivia youth international footballers